Cosmocampus hildebrandi (American dwarf pipefish) is a species of marine fish of the family Syngnathidae. It is found in the western Atlantic Ocean, off of the US coast from North Carolina south to the Gulf of Mexico, off the Yucatan Peninsula (Mexico), and off of northwestern Cuba. This species is ovoviviparous, with males carrying eggs and giving birth to live young.

Etymology
The specific name honours the ichthyologist Samuel F. Hildebrand (1883-1949), who first recognised the holotype as being possibly a new species.

Identifying Features

This species has a stout body, with a squarish cross section. It is a pale brown colour, without any distinctive markings.

References

hildebrandi
Marine fish
Fish of the Atlantic Ocean
Taxa named by Earl Stannard Herald
Fish described in 1965